The Woman Racket is an extant 1930 Pre-Code talking film produced and distributed by Metro-Goldwyn-Mayer starring Tom Moore and Blanche Sweet. It is based on a 1928 Broadway play, Night Hostess by Philip Dunning. In January 2012 the film became available on DVD from the Warner Archive collection home library. It was one of Blanche Sweet's three talking films.

Cast
Tom Moore - Tom Hayes
Blanche Sweet - Julia Barnes Hayes
Sally Starr - Buddy
Robert Agnew - Rags Conway
John Miljan - Chris Miller
Tenen Holtz - Ben
Lew Kelly - Tish
Tom London - Hennessy
Eugene Borden - Lefty
Richard Travers - Frank Wardell

See also
Blanche Sweet filmography

References

External links

Movie synopsis, allmovie.com

1930 films
American films based on plays
American black-and-white films
Metro-Goldwyn-Mayer films
Films directed by Albert H. Kelley
1930 crime drama films
American crime drama films
1930s American films
1930s English-language films